Miguel Filipe Machado de Albuquerque (born 4 May 1961) is a Portuguese politician of the Social Democratic Party (PSD) and the current President of the Regional Government of Madeira. He took office as leader of the PSD of Madeira on 10 January 2015. He was a former mayor (presidente da Câmara in Portuguese) of Funchal, Madeira.
Albuquerque likes gardening, growing many types of roses in his Duchess of Braganza Rose Garden and the Quinta do Arco.

As Mayor of Funchal
As a mayor he signed an agreement to the twinning of the city of Funchal and Gibraltar on 13 May 2009 by the then mayor of Gibraltar Solomon Levy, who had been an Evacuee during the Evacuation of the Gibraltarian civilian population during World War II from Gibraltar to Madeira. Levy then had a meeting with the then President of Madeira Alberto João Jardim.

In April 2012 Miguel opened a road in St Helier, Jersey, which was named Rue de Funchal, after his native city.

Regional Election
In the 29 March 2015 regional elections Albuquerque's centre right party PSD have held on to power after an overall majority with 44.4% of the votes and winning 24 seats in the regional parliament. It was the 11th time in a row the PSD has won an absolute majority in Madeira.

Background into the Election
This election was the first in which PSD's former leader and president of the region, Alberto João Jardim's name did not appear on the ballot, as he stated in 2011, meaning he would step down as the president and leader of PSD-Madeira in 2015. Albuquerque was then elected on 29 December 2014 as president and leader of PSD-Madeira, but he stated that he would not automatically assume the position as president of the Autonomous Region of Madeira without any elections, though parliament was dissolved. In accordance with the law, once parliament is dissolved, the President is obliged go to Lisbon to join a meeting of the Portuguese Council of State and to explain why parliament was dissolved. The president at the time Alberto Joao Jardim was called to attend, which he did and he asked Cavaco Silva, President of Portugal, to call an election in Madeira, which he did so for the 29th of March 2015.

Writings

Books

 Funchal, sobre a Cidade - Colectânea de artigos publicados, Quetzal Editores, 1996; 
 Espelho Múltiplo - Política e Modernidade, Edicarte Editora, 1999; 
 Roseiras Antigas de Jardim, Alêtheia Editora, 2006; 
 Crónicas dum Lugar-Comum, Alêtheia Editora, 2010.

Gallery

References

 

|-

|-

Living people
Madeiran politicians
People from Funchal
Social Democratic Party (Portugal) politicians
1961 births
21st-century Portuguese politicians